Whitehill, Staffordshire is a village North-East of Kidsgrove. Often, it is called a part of Kidsgrove, however the boundaries for the town and the village can be seen upon Atwood Street, near Dove Bank Primary School.

Landmarks
Whitehill is home to Maryhill High School and Maryhill Primary School, as well as GP Doctor's Surgery and a Pharmacy, Birchenwood Park, a small Co-Operative convenience store, a Hairdresser's and a portion of the First Potteries Bus Route 7/7C.
Whitehill's Post Office closed down 5 years ago, yet can you still find it on Job Centre forms.

Geography
Whitehill is North-East of Kidsgrove, and spans approximately 2500 square feet.
Whitehill is also just south of The Rookery, a small village south-west of Mow Cop.
OS Grid Reference: SJ848549
Lat: 53.091
Long: -2.227

References

External links 
 Kidsgrove Web Site
 Whitehill Online

Villages in Staffordshire